Komala Varadan is an Indian classical dancer of Bharatnatyam, writer and the founder of Kalaikoodam, a Delhi-based institute for promoting arts, literature and culture. She is known to be proficient in various art forms such as choreography, photography and painting.

Career 
Ms Varadan learnt classical dance from one of the leading dance maestros of India, Vazhuvoor Ramiah Pillai. She has performed on many stages in India and abroad. Her paintings have been exhibited at many galleries including the Russian Centre of Science and Culture (RCSC), New Delhi and the National Gallery of Modern Art, New Delhi. She has published two novels and a text on Bharatnatyam and has served as the member of the Jury of the 30th National Film Awards for the feature films section. She is also a member of the Authors Guild of India.

Varadan is a recipient of the Kalaimamani Award of the Government of Tamil Nadu, Rajyotsava Prashasthi of the Government of Karnataka, Natya Rani title, International Woman of the Year Award (1998 -1999) of the International Biographical Centre, Cambridge, Sahitya Kala Parishad Samman and the Full Circle Inner Flame Award (1999). The Government of India awarded her the fourth highest civilian honour of the Padma Shri, in 2005, for her contributions to Indian classical dance. Three years earlier, Varadan was in the news for a civil suit filed by her against the Indian Council for Cultural Relations (ICCR), for categorising performing artists over the age of 45 as lecture-demonstration presenters. However, the court ruling was against her. Her life has been documented in an autobiography, Komala Varadan, published in 1985.

See also 
 Bharatnatyam
 30th National Film Awards

References

External links

Further reading 
 

Living people
Recipients of the Padma Shri in arts
Year of birth missing (living people)
Indian classical choreographers
Bharatanatyam exponents
Indian women painters
Indian women photographers
21st-century Indian photographers
Indian women novelists
20th-century Indian novelists
Recipients of the Rajyotsava Award
Recipients of the Kalaimamani Award
Indian women choreographers
Indian choreographers
Writers from Delhi
Women writers from Delhi
20th-century Indian women writers
Women artists from Delhi
20th-century Indian women artists
Dancers from Delhi
Photographers from Delhi
Novelists from Delhi
20th-century women photographers
21st-century women photographers